The  is a limited edition mid-size car made by Toyota and released in Japan between 2000 and 2001. It was made available for sale in November 2000. It was planned that only 1,000 units of the car would be available, but in fact, 1,073 units were produced. In Japan, it was sold at Toyota Store, Toyopet Store and Corolla Store Japanese dealerships.

The Origin features a distinct retro style body modeled from the RS series Toyopet Crown and built using the same platform and inline-six engine as the Progrès. The car was built by Kanto Auto Works in Higashi Fuji plant.

The vehicle's design employed many features unusual on modern vehicles to make it reminiscent of the original Crown, including rear suicide doors, a rearward-slanting C-pillar and jewel tail lamps. Due to its exterior dimensions and engine displacement, it was regarded as a mid-size car for exceeding Japanese government dimension regulations and it also obligated Japanese drivers to pay a higher amount of annual road tax for the larger engine.

References

External links 

 21st Century Toyota Origin concept car

Origin
Rear-wheel-drive vehicles
Mid-size cars
Sedans
Cars introduced in 2000
Cars discontinued in 2001
Retro-style automobiles